Thomas Cholmondeley, 1st Baron Delamere (9 August 1767 – 30 October 1855), was a British peer and Member of Parliament.

Background

He was the son of Thomas Cholmondeley (1726–1779), Member of Parliament for Cheshire. On his father's side he descended from a younger brother of Robert Cholmondeley, 1st Earl of Leinster, and Hugh Cholmondeley, father of Robert Cholmondeley, 1st Viscount Cholmondeley, from whom the Marquesses of Cholmondeley descend. His mother was Dorothy Cowper. Delamere was an indirect descendant of Sir Robert Walpole, the first Prime Minister of Great Britain.

The Cholmondeleys were long established at their seat at Vale Royal Abbey, Cheshire which had been in the family since 1615.

Career
Cholmondeley served as High Sheriff of Cheshire in 1792 and then in 1796 was elected to the House of Commons for his father's old seat of Cheshire, which he retained until 1812. On 17 July 1821 he was raised to the peerage as Baron Delamere, of Vale Royal in the County Palatine of Chester. The current baron, the 5th Baron Delamere, paints a picture of his early-19th century ancestor with deft, harsh strokes:
"[The 1st Baron Delamere] was an idiot who decided it would be impressive to have a peerage. He thought he had a bargain when he paid 5,000 for it. The only problem was that the going rate was 1,200. Before he came along we had been content to be shire knights in Cheshire, when William the Conqueror gave us the whole county."

Family
On 17 December 1810, Cholmondeley married Henrietta Elizabeth Williams-Wynn, daughter of Sir Watkin Williams-Wynn, 4th Baronet, and Charlotte Grenville. That union produced six children and numerous grandchildren:

 Hugh (3 October 1811 – 1 August 1887) married Sarah Hay-Drummund, and later married Augusta Emily Seymour.
 Thomas  (4 January 1817 – 10 August 1817)
 Thomas Grenville (4 August 1818 – 9 February 1883) married Katherine Lucy Sykes, and later married Violet Maud Parker
 Henry Pitt (15 June 1820 – 14 April 1905) married Mary Leigh
 Francis Grenville (1850–1937).
 Lionel Berners (1858–1945).
 Edward Chandos (1860–1957).
 Henry Reginald (1862–1947).
 Charles Fiennes (1863–1959).
 Alice Margarette (18__–1937).
 Mary Louisa (18__–1947).
 Rose Evelyn (18__ –1907).
 Eleanor Caroline (18__–1947).
 Henrietta Charlotte (3 June 1823 – 13 August 1874).
 Charles Watkin Neville  (27 May 1826 – 18 March 1844).—unmarried

The marriage of the baron's third son, Henry, produced nine grandchildren; and of these, Lionel would become chaplain to the  British Embassy in Tokyo and would write the first English-language history of the isolated Bonin Islands, including notes of changes which evolved after annexation by Meiji Japan in 1875.

Cholmondeley died at age 88 in October 1855.  He was succeeded in the land, estates and title by his eldest son Hugh Cholmondeley.

See also
 Lionel Berners Cholmondeley

Notes

References
 Debrett, John, Charles Kidd, David Williamson. (1990).  Debrett's Peerage and Baronetage.  New York: Macmillan. 
 Hayden, Joseph. (1851).  The book of dignities: containing rolls of the official personages of the British Empire. London: Longmans, Brown, Green, and Longmans. 
 Holland, G. D., et al. (1977).  Vale Royal Abbey and House. Winsford, Cheshire: Winsford Local History Society. 

1767 births
1855 deaths
Barons in the Peerage of the United Kingdom
Cholmondeley, Thomas
Cholmondeley, Thomas
Cholmondeley, Thomas
Cholmondeley, Thomas
Cholmondeley, Thomas
Cholmondeley, Thomas
Cholmondeley, Thomas
High Sheriffs of Cheshire
Thomas
Peers of the United Kingdom created by George IV